The 2011 Surinamese Hoofdklasse and Eerste Klasse playoffs was a home-away aggregate playoff series between the 9th-place Hoofdklasse club of the 2010–11 season, and the winner of the #2 vs. #3 playoff of the 2010–11 Eerste Klasse play-off.

Results 

Voorwaarts win 6–2 on aggregate and remain in the Hoofdklasse

 

playoff